Ranotsara may refer to the following municipalities in Madagascar:

 Ranotsara, a village near Ambatomainty, Ikalamavony, in the Haute Matsiatra
 Ranotsara Nord or Ranotsara Avaratra, a municipality in Iakora District,  Ihorombe
 Ranotsara Sud or Ranotsara Atsimo, a municipality in Befotaka Sud District, Atsimo-Atsinanana